Tai Po Waterfront Park is a park in Tai Po in the New Territories of Hong Kong. It is located along the Tolo Harbour, and its western end is at the northern part of the mouth of the Lam Tsuen River. The Park opened in 1994 at a cost of $210-million, but was not completed until 1997 with the creation of the Tai Po Lookout Tower.

Every year, the Tai Po Dragon Boat Race is held in the sea off the park.

Facilities
The park has a wide range of public facilities including rest gardens, sitting-out areas, an insect house, a  promenade along the harbour front, a jogging trail with fitness stations and a 600-seat amphitheatre. The park also has the only dedicated model boat pool in Hong Kong. The park is also the start of the popular cycle route to Tai Mei Tuk. Cycle hires are available in the park.

Lookout tower

The plaques of the lookout tower depict the history of Tai Po, including the struggle with the British army when they originally entered the New Territories, the heroic resistance against the Japanese army during the occupation and prosperity after World War II.

Gallery

References

See also

List of urban public parks and gardens in Hong Kong

Urban public parks and gardens in Hong Kong
Tai Po